The Presbytery of New York was a presbytery formed in 1717 as the Long Island Presbytery by the division of the Presbytery of Philadelphia into three sections. It covered the Province of New York. It was merged with the Presbytery of East Jersey in 1738 and renamed the Presbytery of New York.

References

1717 establishments in the Province of New York
Presbyteries and classes
Presbyterian organizations established in the 18th century